Motasem Masaud Sabbou (born 20 August 1993), is a Libyan football player who plays for the Libyan national football team.

International career

International goals
Scores and results list Libya's goal tally first.

References

1993 births
Living people
Libyan footballers
Association football midfielders
Libya international footballers
Al-Ittihad Club (Tripoli) players
US Monastir (football) players
Libyan expatriate footballers
Expatriate footballers in Tunisia
Tunisian Ligue Professionnelle 1 players
Libyan Premier League players
Libya A' international footballers
2014 African Nations Championship players
Libyan expatriate sportspeople in Tunisia
2018 African Nations Championship players